Can Canatan (born March 29, 1979), better known by his stage name Stress, is a Swedish musician and music producer.

Biography and career 
Canatan was born and raised in Solna, Stockholm. He began his music career as a DJ at the age of 16. By the time he turned 18 he gained recognition in the Swedish hip hop industry as a hip hop producer. Stress is now signed to Rocnation Publishing and is working internationally.

Discography

Albums

Production
Sweden
Produced entirely by "Stress"
2012: Kartellen – Ånger och kamp (Studio album)
2013: Abidaz – In och ut (Studio album)
2013: Kartellen – Ånger och Kamp 2 (Studio album)

USA/Abroad
2005: Pretty Ricky – "Call Me"
2011: Nikos Ganos – "Break Me"
2012: K Koke – "Only One"
2013: Mindless Behavior – "I'm Fallin" from album All Around the World

References

External links
 http://rocnation.com/stress/

Swedish Links

About Stress 
 http://www.dn.se/kultur-noje/musik/svenske-stress-pa-jay-z-bolag
 http://www.kingsizemagazine.se/nyheter/producenten-stress-signar-till-roc-nation/

Album Reviews 
 http://www.dn.se/kultur-noje/skivrecensioner/stress-playlist
 http://hallandsposten.se/nojekultur/recensioner/skivrecensioner/1.1407759-stress-playlist-
 http://www.kristianstadsbladet.se/noje/skivrecensioner/article1565857/Stress-Playlist.html
 http://www.sydsvenskan.se/kultur--nojen/musik/skivrecensioner/stress-samlar-svensk-hiphopelit/
 http://nojesguiden.se/recensioner/musik/stress-playlist
 http://www.aftonbladet.se/nojesbladet/musik/recensioner/article15856646.ab?teaser=true
 http://arbetarbladet.se/noje/recensioner/paskiva/1.5338719-kartellen
 http://gaffa.se/recension/67120
 http://www.sydsvenskan.se/kultur--nojen/musik/skivrecensioner/kartellen/
 http://www.vf.se/kultur-noje/skivor/kartellen

1979 births
Living people
People from Solna Municipality
Hip hop record producers
Swedish hip hop musicians
Swedish pop singers
Swedish record producers
21st-century Swedish singers